Grenada competed at the 2018 Commonwealth Games in the Gold Coast, Australia from April 4 to April 15, 2018. It was Grenada's 10th appearance at the Commonwealth Games.

The Grenadian team consisted of 15 athletes (11 men and four women) that competed across four sports. However, only 14 competed.

Medalists

Competitors
The following is the list of number of competitors participating at the Games per sport/discipline.

Athletics

Grenada participated with 8 athletes (7 men and 1 woman).

Men
Track & road events

Field events

Combined events – Decathlon

Women
Track & road events

Beach volleyball

Grenada received a wildcard for a women's beach volleyball team of two athletes.

Boxing

Grenada participated with a team of 2 athletes (2 men)

Men

Swimming

Grenada participated with 2 athletes (1 man and 1 woman).

Men

Women

See also
Grenada at the 2018 Summer Youth Olympics

References

Nations at the 2018 Commonwealth Games
Grenada at the Commonwealth Games
2018 in Grenadian sport